Skawica  is a village in the administrative district of Gmina Zawoja, within Sucha County, Lesser Poland Voivodeship, in southern Poland, close to the border with Slovakia.

The village has a population of 2,600.

References

Villages in Sucha County